Adedayo Clement Adeyeye  is a Nigerian politician.

Background
Adeyeye Clement Adedayo was born on 4 April 1957 in Ikere-Ekiti, to the royal family of Oba David Opeyemi Adeyeye, Agunsoye II, the Arinjale of Ise Ekiti (who reigned between 1932 and 1976), and Olori Mary Ojulege Adeyeye, a princess of Are, Ikere-Ekiti.
His grandfather was Oba Aweloye I, Arinjale of Ise Ekiti (1887-1919).

Education 
Between 1964 and 1968, Clement Adedayo attended St. John's Primary School, Are, Ikere-Ekiti for his primary education. He later proceeded to Annunciation school, Ikere-Ekiti (1969-1973), before attending Christ's School Ado Ekiti (1973-1975). 
Adeyeye holds a bachelor's degree in political science from the University of Ibadan (1978) and a master's degree in political science (international relations) from the University of Lagos (1981). He also obtained a law degree from the University of Lagos in 1986 and was called to the Nigerian Bar in 1987.

Professional career 
Senator Adeyeye work experience has spanned three major professional fields - teaching, journalism and legal practice.

Prince Adeyeye was a teacher at Isuikwuato High School, Isuikwuato, Imo State during his National Youth service (1978-1979) and proceeded to teach at Mary Immaculate Grammar School, Ado-Ekiti (1980). 
Adeyeye made the switch to journalism in 1981 and was Editor II at the Federal Radio Corporation of Nigeria (FRCN), Ikoyi, between 1981 and 1982.
He had a brief stint at Rank Xerox Limited in 1983 where he was a Senior Sales Executive. Between 1983 and 1987, he held various editorial positions at The Punch newspapers. 
During his active years in legal practice, Prince Adeyeye was the Principal Partner at the law firm of Dayo Adeyeye & Co. between 1990 and 2000.

Politics 
As a pro-democracy activist, Clement Adedayo was a member of the National Democratic Coalition (NADECO).
He was Director of Publicity, Falae for President Campaign Organisation (1990-1992), Adviser on policy and Press Matters, M.K.O. Abiola for President Campaign Organisation (1993), spokesperson for the Alliance for Democracy (AD), and a member of the South-West Delegation to the Nigerian leaders of Thought Conference, Abuja. Prince Adeyeye, was the youngest of the 21 eminent leaders who represented the South Western zone of Nigeria at the Conference (2001)
Clement Adedayo was also the National Publicity secretary of the Pan Yoruba Socio-political group called Afenifere between 2001-2004 as well as the spokesperson of the AD between 2004-2006.

Clement Adedayo was a member of the Odua Development Union (ODU) which was established for the overall Socio-political and economic development of the South-West.

In 2006, Clement Adedayo was an Ekiti State governorship aspirant under AD, which later metamorphosed into the Action Congress of Nigeria, and was runner up to Governor Kayode Fayemi in the controversial primary elections that led to the defection of 13 of the total 16 aspirants from the Action Congress of Nigeria to the People's Democratic Party (PDP). Prince Adeyeye was among those who defected.

After the 2007 election, Clement Adedayo was nominated for a position as a minister of the Federal Republic of Nigeria under the President Umaru Musa Yaradua administration, but his past roles as spokesperson for the opposition party and the National Publicity secretary of the Afenifere group worked against his final appointment as minister.

Clement Adedayo was subsequently appointed Executive Chairman of Ekiti State Universal Basic Education Board (SUBEB) under the administration of Governor Segun Oni, where he recorded several achievements and won the Universal Basic Education Commission (UBEC) award as the best chairman in the South-West of Nigeria in 2008. The award came along with a cash prize of Seventy Million Naira. He again won the same award as the best Chairman of SUBEB in the South West in 2009. The funds derived from the awards were used to provide more infrastructure for schools across Ekiti State. That same year, Prince Adedayo Adeyeye was adjudged the most innovative SUBEB chairman in Nigeria by the Presidential Committee on Schools’ debate. He was the only SUBEB chairman in the country selected by the World Bank to attend the conference on Strategies for Education Reform, sponsored by the World Bank in Washington, United States in March, 2010. His administration successfully organised the training of over 12,000 teachers within Ekiti State on contemporary teaching methods.
As chairman of Ekiti SUBEB, Adeyeye changed the face of public school buildings in the State with the introduction of story buildings and tiled floors and provision of school furniture. During his tenure as SUBEB chairman, pupils stopped carrying furniture to school from their homes. The quality of the furnishings were regarded as the best in the country.

Once again, in  2014, Prince Adeyeye was nominated by President Goodluck Jonathan as a Minister of the Federal Republic of Nigeria. This time, his nomination was approved by the Nigerian senate and he was sworn in by President Goodluck Jonathan on 9 July of that year as Minister of State for Works. He served as Minister till the end of President Goodluck Jonathan's administration on 29 May 2015.

Prince Adeyeye was appointed by the Ekiti State Government as Pro Chancellor of the Ekiti State University in June 2015 and he is the current Chairman of the University's Governing Council.

In 2018, Clement Adedayo declared interest in the race for Ekiti Governorship seat and ran for the ticket of the Peoples Democratic Party (PDP) but controversially lost to Kolapo Olusola-Eleka, the anointed candidates of the sitting Governor - Peter Ayodele Fayose. This made him and his supporters defect to the All Progressive Congress (APC), a move that eventually led to the APC winning the election. Sen Adedayo Adeyeye is the Chairman of Southwest Agenda'23 (SWAGA).

National Caretaker Committee 
Following the inauguration of the National Caretaker Committee of the PDP on 7 June 2016, Prince Adeyeye was nominated as the representative of the South-Western Region of Nigeria. He was subsequently appointed as the National Publicity Secretary of the party under the leadership of Senator Ahmed Makarfi on 9 June 2016 and currently serves the party in that capacity.
Adeyeye stopped acting in that capacity after the administration of party's executive committee headed by Prince Uche Secondus. He later contested the 8 May 2018 Governorship Primaries of his party in Ekiti State, but he lost to the anointed candidate and the Incumbent Deputy Governor Kolapo Olusola Eleka.

Campaign for Ekiti State Governorship 
Sen Adedayo Adeyeye was an aspirant for the Ekiti State 2018 gubernatorial elections under the platform of the PDP whose support cut across party lines. He has often been described as a unifying factor for the PDP within the state.

In an interview with the Leadership Newspaper, Adeyeye highlighted his first eleven priorities which pointed at revolutions in agriculture, education, employment figures, health and social welfare amongst others.

Senatorial aspirations 
Adeyeye declared for Senate on Thursday 6 September 2018 at Ise Ekiti during the Senatorial meeting of the party held in his home and attended by party's bigwigs and aspirants from the zone.

Prince Adedayo Adeyeye defeated Senator Biodun Olujimi of PDP in Ekiti South Senatorial District in the National Assembly election conducted on Saturday, 23 February 2019. The Returning Officer for Ekiti South Senatorial District, Professor Laide Lawal, returned Prince Adeyeye, elected having scored 77,621 votes to defeat his closest rival, Olujimi, who polled 53,741 votes. During the 2019 election tribunal, his closest rival, Olujimi was declared winner after the result was recalculated under controversial circumstances.

References 

1957 births
Living people
People from Ekiti State
Yoruba politicians
University of Ibadan alumni
University of Lagos alumni
Peoples Democratic Party (Nigeria) politicians
Yoruba royalty
Nigerian schoolteachers
Yoruba educators
Nigerian editors
Christ's School, Ado Ekiti alumni
Members of the Senate (Nigeria)
21st-century Nigerian politicians